A grandstand is a normally permanent structure for seating spectators.  This includes both auto racing and horse racing.  The grandstand is in essence like a single section of a stadium, but differs from a stadium in that it does not wrap all or most of the way around.  Grandstands may have basic bench seating, but usually have individual chairs like a stadium.  Grandstands are also usually covered with a roof, but are open on the front.  They are often multi-tiered.

Grandstands are found at places like Epsom Downs Racecourse and Atlanta Motor Speedway.  They may also be found at fairgrounds, circuses, and outdoor arenas used for rodeos.

In the United States, smaller stands are called bleachers, and are usually far more basic and typically single-tiered (hence the difference from a "grand stand"). Early baseball games were often staged at fairgrounds, and the term "grandstand" came along when standalone baseball parks began to be built. A covered bleacher may be called a "pavilion", also to distinguish from the main "grandstand".

The term grandstanding, from the notion of playing to the people in the grandstands, is often used as a pejorative to describe someone drawing unwarranted attention to themselves.

Gallery

See also

Baseball park
Bleacher

References

Sports venues